Islands of Britain may refer to:
British Isles, the archipelago off north-western Europe
British Islands, a term referring collectively to the United Kingdom, along with a group of territories with constitutional links to the country
List of islands of the British Isles
List of islands of the United Kingdom
Islands of Britain (TV series)

See also
British Isles naming dispute
Terminology of the British Isles